The 1913 Denver Pioneers football team represented the University of Denver as a member of the Rocky Mountain Conference (RMC) during the 1913 college football season. In their first and only season under head coach Charles Wingender, the Pioneers compiled a 2–5 record (1–3 against conference opponents), finished sixth in the RMC, and were outscored by a total of 140 to 47.

Schedule

References

Denver
Denver Pioneers football seasons
Denver Pioneers football